The 1998–99 NBA season was the 53rd season for the Boston Celtics in the National Basketball Association. On March 23, 1998, the owners of all 29 NBA teams voted 27–2 to reopen the league's collective bargaining agreement, seeking changes to the league's salary cap system, and a ceiling on individual player salaries. The National Basketball Players Association (NBPA) opposed to the owners' plan, and wanted raises for players who earned the league's minimum salary. After both sides failed to reach an agreement, the owners called for a lockout, which began on July 1, 1998, putting a hold on all team trades, free agent signings and training camp workouts, and cancelling many NBA regular season and preseason games. Due to the lockout, the NBA All-Star Game, which was scheduled to be played in Philadelphia on February 14, 1999, was also cancelled. However, on January 6, 1999, NBA commissioner David Stern, and NBPA director Billy Hunter finally reached an agreement to end the lockout. The deal was approved by both the players and owners, and was signed on January 20, ending the lockout after 204 days. The regular season began on February 5, and was cut short to just 50 games instead of the regular 82-game schedule.

This season is most memorable when the Celtics selected future All-Star, and one-time champion Paul Pierce from the University of Kansas with the tenth pick in the 1998 NBA draft. In the off-season, the team acquired second-year center Tony Battie from the Los Angeles Lakers. Pierce would get off to a fast start as he was named Rookie of the Month in February. However, after a 7–7 start to the season, the Celtics struggled losing ten of their next eleven games, as they traded Andrew DeClercq to the Cleveland Cavaliers in exchange for Vitaly Potapenko. The Celtics finished fifth in the Atlantic Division with a 19–31 record, as fans began to get restless with head coach Rick Pitino's slow growth.

Antoine Walker averaged 18.7 points, 8.5 rebounds and 1.5 steals per game, while second-year star Ron Mercer averaged 17.0 points and 1.6 steals per game, and Pierce provided the team with 16.5 points, 6.4 rebounds and 1.7 steals per game, and was named to the NBA All-Rookie First Team, and finished in third place in Rookie of the Year voting.  In addition, Kenny Anderson contributed 12.1 points and 5.7 assists per game, while off the bench, sixth man Dana Barros provided with 9.3 points and 4.2 assists per game, and Battie averaged 6.7 points, 6.0 rebounds and 1.4 blocks per game.

Following the season, Mercer was traded along with Popeye Jones to the Denver Nuggets, and Bruce Bowen signed as a free agent with the Philadelphia 76ers.

Draft picks

Roster

Roster Notes
 Power forward Pervis Ellison missed the entire season due to an ankle injury.

Regular season

Season standings

z - clinched division title
y - clinched division title
x - clinched playoff spot

Record vs. opponents

Game log

Player statistics

Awards and records
 Paul Pierce, NBA All-Rookie Team 1st Team

Transactions

References

See also
 1998–99 NBA season

Boston Celtics seasons
Boston Celtics
Boston Celtics
Boston Celtics
Celtics
Celtics